Stuart Beavon may refer to:

Stuart Beavon (footballer born 1958), English footballer
Stuart Beavon (footballer born 1984), English footballer